Stevan Bojović (born 7 June 1995) is a Serbian football goalkeeper, playing for Takovo.

Club career

Metalac Gornji Milanovac
Born in Gornji Milanovac, Bojović passed the Metalac Gornji Milanovac youth school, and was a member of generation which made promotion to the best level Serbian youth league in 2014. He has also joined the club first team for the 2013–14 Serbian First League season. After the end of his youth career, he was loaned to Morava Zone League club Takovo for the first half of 2014–15 season. Bojović made his senior debut for Metalac in last fixture of the 2015–16 Serbian SuperLiga season. Bojović was also loaned to Takovo for the first half of 2016–17 season in the Morava Zone League. After he was used as a back-up choice several times in last fixtures of the first half-season in the Serbian SuperLiga, Bojović permanently moved to Takovo in the winter break off-season, as a single-player.

Career statistics

References

External links
 Stevan Bojović stats at utakmica.rs
 
 

1995 births
Living people
People from Gornji Milanovac
Association football goalkeepers
Serbian footballers
FK Metalac Gornji Milanovac players
FK Takovo players
Serbian SuperLiga players